Douglas John McCarthy (born 1 September 1966) is the vocalist of the English EBM band Nitzer Ebb.

McCarthy writes and performs with the band. He has appeared on multiple recordings by Recoil and has released material in collaboration with DJ Terence Fixmer as Fixmer/McCarthy. 
He contributed vocals to tracks by Die Krupps, Motor, KLOQ (band), Client, and more recently Kenneth James Gibson's Reverse Commuter project.

After Nitzer Ebb originally split, McCarthy began his work with Recoil, then left the music business and focused on film studies and design in Cambridge. He moved to London in 2000 to work in the advertising field.

Solo work
McCarthy's first solo album was originally titled Life Is Sucking the Life Out of Me. The album was written, recorded and mixed at Easier with songwriter/musician/producer Stephen Papke and British house DJ/producer Mark "Blakkat" Bell. All songs were co-written by McCarthy, Papke and Bell.

Currently performing as Douglas J. McCarthy, his first solo album, Kill Your Friends, was released in November 2012 on Los Angeles-based label Pylon Records. 
McCarthy collaborated with Headman and producer Scott Fraser on the Noise EP, and with Cyrus Rex on the DJMREX EP.

See also
 Bloodline (Recoil album)
 Unsound Methods (Recoil album)

References

External links
 
 Pylon Records' website

1966 births
Living people
English male singers
Electronic body music musicians
Singers from London
Nitzer Ebb members
Pigface members